The Unity Alliance ( - AU) was a Nicaraguan electoral alliance of three center left and right parties in the Nicaraguan 1996 elections. Members of the coalition were:

Social Christian Party (PSC)
Social Democratic Party (PSD) 
Revolutionary Unity Movement (MUR)

The presidential candidate of the Unity Alliance was Alejandro Serrano Caldera who pulled 5,207 out of 1,773,401 valid votes. In the legislative election they received 0.82% of the vote, which resulted in 1 seat.

References

Political parties established in 1996
Defunct political parties in Nicaragua
Political party alliances in Nicaragua